Paulo Ibire (born 1 May 1967) is an Argentine former wrestler. He competed in the men's freestyle 68 kg at the 1996 Summer Olympics.

References

External links
 

1967 births
Living people
Argentine male sport wrestlers
Olympic wrestlers of Argentina
Wrestlers at the 1996 Summer Olympics
Place of birth missing (living people)
20th-century Argentine people
21st-century Argentine people